Jatindra Rajendra Mahavidyalaya, also known as Amtala College established in 1986, is a general degree college of Amtala in Murshidabad district. It offers undergraduate courses in arts. It is affiliated to University of Kalyani.

History 
Especially the then MLA of Revolutionary Socialist Party (RSP) and political leader Jayanta Biswas tried to establish a college for this locality. The process of establishing the Institution was initiated by Guru Prasad Biswas and Birendranath Biswas. They donated 1.5 lakhs for the Institution and the college was named after their respective fathers, Jatindranath and Rajendranath. The land was provided by Amtala High School.

Departments

Arts

Bengali
English
Sanskrit
History
Political Science
Education
Philosophy
Arabic

Accreditation
In 2016 Jatindra Rajendra Mahavidyalaya was awarded B grade by the National Assessment and Accreditation Council (NAAC). The college is recognized by the University Grants Commission (UGC).

See also

References

External links
 
University of Kalyani
University Grants Commission
National Assessment and Accreditation Council

Colleges affiliated to University of Kalyani
Educational institutions established in 1986
Universities and colleges in Murshidabad district
1986 establishments in West Bengal